Leo Connolly (born 7 August 2001) is an Australian rules footballer playing for the St Kilda Football Club in the Australian Football League (AFL). He was recruited by St Kilda with the 64th pick in the 2019 AFL draft, and debuted for St Kilda as a medical substitute against Richmond during the 2021 AFL season.

Early football
Originally hailing from the west Gippsland town of Trafalgar, Connolly began playing with the Moe Football Club in 2016, before joining the Gippsland Power in the NAB League, where he became known for his dashing run off half-back and elite kicking. He was ultimately selected by the St Kilda Football Club with pick no. 64 in the 2019 AFL draft, their second and final pick.

AFL career

Connolly was not able to make his debut in 2020, and in a Covid-interrupted season was largely relegated to playing scratch matches with the cancellation of the VFL following the outbreak of the pandemic. This made it difficult for Connolly to break into the senior side, who went on to make the Semi Final that year.

Connolly ultimately replaced Coffield on-field and gained 11 disposals in his first quarter of football. Following an impressive debut, Connolly retained his place in the team for seven consequtive matches before a concussion sustained in Round 21 saw him miss the final two games of the year. Connolly averaged 12 disposals, three marks, eight kicks per game in 2021, with his best game coming in Round 20 against Carlton where he had 18 disposals, 13 kicks and three marks.

Statistics
 Statistics are correct to the end of the 2021 season

|- style="background-color: #EAEAEA"
! scope="row" style="text-align:center" | 2021
|
| 37 || 7 || 1 || 1 || 56 || 27 || 83|| 22|| 4 || 0.14 || 0.14 || 8.00 || 3.86 || 11.86 || 3.14 || 0.57
|- class="sortbottom"
! colspan=3| Career
! 7
! 1
! 1
! 56
! 27
! 83
! 22
! 4
! 0.14
! 0.14
! 8.00
! 3.86
! 11.86
! 3.14
! 0.57
|}

Notes

References

External links

2001 births
Living people
St Kilda Football Club players
Australian rules footballers from Victoria (Australia)
Gippsland Power players
Sandringham Football Club players